Madeline Östlund (born 10 July 1992) is a Swedish handballer for SV Union Halle-Neustadt in the Handball-Bundesliga Frauen.

Achievements 
SHE:
Silver Medalist: 2013, 2014, 2015, 2016
Danish Championship:
Silver Medalist: 2021
Bronze Medalist: 2020

References

1992 births
Living people
People from Nacka Municipality
Swedish female handball players
Swedish expatriate sportspeople in Germany
Sportspeople from Stockholm County
21st-century Swedish women